CT or ct may refer to:

In arts and media
 c't (Computer Technik), a German computer magazine
 Freelancer Agent Connecticut (C.T.), a fictional character in the web series Red vs. Blue
 Christianity Today, an American evangelical Christian magazine

Businesses and organizations
 CT Corp, an Indonesian conglomerate
 CT Corporation, an umbrella brand for two businesses: CT Corporation and CT Liena
 C|T Group, formerly Crosby Textor Group, social research and political polling company 
 Canadian Tire, a Canadian company engaged in retailing, financial services and petroleum
 Calgary Transit, the public transit service in Calgary, Alberta, Canada
 Central Trains (National Rail abbreviation), a former train operating company in the United Kingdom
 Česká televize, the public television broadcaster in the Czech Republic
 Community Transit, the public transit service in Snohomish County, Washington, U.S.
 Comunión Tradicionalista, a former Spanish political party
 CT (TV channel), a Filipino cable and satellite television network

Finance
 Centime (ct), the French for "cent", used in English in several Francophone countries
 Stotinki (ст), the currency of Bulgaria

Places
 CT postcode area, for Canterbury and surrounding areas in south-eastern England
 Connecticut (United States postal abbreviation)

 Province of Catania (vehicle registration code), Sicily, Italy

 Central African Republic (FIPS Pub 10-4 code and obsolete NATO diagram)
 Canton and Enderbury Islands (obsolete ISO 3166 country code), part of the Phoenix Islands in the Pacific Ocean
Cape Town (capital city of the Western Cape, South Africa)

 Ct, for "Court"; a street suffix as used in the US

Science and technology

Biology and medicine
 Haplogroup CT, Y-DNA haplogroup.
 CT scan or X-ray computed tomography, a medical imaging method
 Calcitonin (symbol CT), a hormone produced in the thyroid gland
 Calibrated automated thrombogram (CT or CAT), a coagulation test
 Cardiothoracic surgery, the field of medicine specializing in chest surgery
 Chemotype (ct.), a chemically distinct entity in a plant or microorganism
 Cognitive therapy, a type of psychotherapy
 Connective tissue, a type of biological tissue
 Chelation therapy
 Chemotherapy
Cholera toxin, a toxic protein secreted by Vibrio cholerae
 Threshold Cycle (Ct), see cycle of quantification/qualification
 COVID-19 test

Computing
 Intel Ct, a SIMD multithreading programming model developed by Intel
 Certificate Transparency, in network security

Other uses in science and technology
 CT Value, in drinking water disinfection
 Threshold cycle (Ct), a measure in the cycle of quantification/qualification of a real-time polymerase chain reaction
 Carat (purity) (ct), a measure of the purity of gold and platinum alloys
 Carat (mass) (ct), a unit of mass used for measuring gems and pearls
 Continuous-time signal, a varying quantity (a signal) whose domain is a continuum
 Center tap, a wire that is connected halfway along one of the windings of a transformer, inductor or a resistor
 Compliant Tower, a deepwater offshore oil platform
 Convective temperature, in atmospheric science
 Current transformer, a kind of transformer used in the electrical power industry

Transportation
 Lexus CT, an automobile
 Honda CT series, a series of Honda bikes
 Crawler-transporter, a tracked vehicle used to transport the Space Shuttle from Vehicle Assembly Building to Launch Complex 39
 Civil Air Transport (IATA code)
 Training cruiser, a U.S. Navy hull classification

Other uses
 Ct, a typographic ligature
 c. t. (cum tempore, Latin for "with time"), indicates that a lecture will begin a quarter-hour after the stated time; see Academic quarter
 Central Time Zone, a time zone in Canada, the United States, and Mexico
 Coffin Texts
 Conspiracy theory or theorist
 Counter-terrorism
 Cryptologic technician, a United States Navy enlisted rating or job specialty
 Chinese Taipei, the name used by Taiwan in some international organizations due to political pressure from the People's Republic of China
 ct followed by a number means the number of items contained in a cardboard (e.g. zucchini 3 ct)
 Corps Turd, etymologically "Cadet in Training", member of the Texas A&M Corps of Cadets that is not in the band

See also
 Champions Trophy (disambiguation), several trophies awarded in different sports
 Central tendon (disambiguation)